Bethell is an English surname. Notable people with the surname include:

Alexander Bethell (1855–1932), Royal Navy officer who went on to be Commander-in-Chief, Plymouth
Anna Bethell (1882–1969), English actress, singer and stage director
Bob Bethell, Republican member of the Kansas House of Representatives, representing the 113th district
Christopher Bethell (1773–1859), Bishop of Bangor
Ernest Bethell, British journalist who worked in Korea under Japanese rule
George Bethell (1849–1919), Royal Navy officer and Conservative politician
Hugh Bethell (died 1679) (1615–1679), English politician who sat in the House of Commons from 1660 to 1679
Hugh Bethell (British Army officer), Major-General in the First World War
James Bethell, 5th Baron Bethell (born 1967), British Conservative politician
John Bethell, 1st Baron Bethell (1861–1945), British banker and Liberal politician, created Baron Bethell
Lauran Bethell (21st century), American Baptist missionary
Leonard Arthur Bethell (1879–1950), Lieutenant Colonel in Gurkha regiments in North East India, author, member of the Younghusband expedition to Tibet, 1904
Leslie Bethell (born 1937), English historian, university professor, and Brazilianist
Marie Bethell Beauclerc (1845–1897), pioneer in the teaching of Pitman's shorthand and typing in Birmingham, England
Nicholas Bethell, 4th Baron Bethell (1938–2007), British historian of Central and Eastern Europe
Ray Bethell, professional kite flyer in Vancouver, Canada
Richard Bethell, 1st Baron Westbury (1800–1873), Lord Chancellor of Great Britain
Richard Bethell (1772–1864) (1772–1864), British Tory and then Conservative Party politician from Rise, Yorkshire
Roy Bethell (1906–1976), English footballer
Tabrett Bethell (born ), Australian model and actress
Tom Bethell (born 1936), journalist who writes mainly on economic and scientific issues
Tony Bethell (1922–2004), RAF pilot and participant in the "Great Escape"
Zachary Bethell (died 1635), royal servant

See also
Te Henga (Bethells Beach), New Zealand
Bethells Bridge, swing bridge across the Driffield Navigation in Yorkshire, England
Bethell's Island, Bermuda
Bethel (disambiguation)
Vernon v Bethell (1762), English property law case

English-language surnames